The 2013 NCAA Women's Gymnastics Championship was held in Pauley Pavilion, on the campus of UCLA in Los Angeles, California on April 19–21, 2013. The team competition was won by the Florida Gators. Twelve teams from the six regional meets advanced to the NCAA Division I national team and individual titles. The selection show announcing the regional pairings was held on Monday, March 25 at noon PT on NCAA.com.

Regional Championships
Regional Championships were held on April 6, 2013 at the following six sites with start times between 4 and 6 p.m. local time:
 Columbus Regional (Ohio State, host) 6 p.m. – LSU (197.275), UCLA (196.950), Arizona (196.100), Ohio State (196.050), North Carolina St (195.275), Central Michigan (194.925)
 Corvallis Regional  (Oregon State, host) 4 p.m. – Georgia (197.425), Arkansas (196.950), Arizona State (195.700), Oregon State (195.375), Boise State (195.300) and California (195.125)
 Gainesville Regional  (Florida, host) 6 p.m. – Florida (198.40), Minnesota (197.10), Auburn (196.70), Maryland (195.575), Pittsburgh (194.775) and Bridgeport (194.225)
 Morgantown Regional  (West Virginia, host) 6 p.m. – Michigan (196.725), Illinois (196.025), Nebraska, Kentucky, West Virginia, North Carolina
 Norman Regional (Oklahoma, host) 4 p.m. – Oklahoma (197.375), Stanford (196.800), Washington (195.925), Penn State (195.875), Iowa (194.475) and Southern Utah (194.850)
 Tuscaloosa Regional (Alabama, host) 6 p.m. – Alabama (197.400), Utah (196.400), Denver, Kent State, Brigham Young, Iowa State

NCAA Women's Gymnastics Championship
The NCAA Women's Gymnastics Championship was held in Pauley Pavilion, Los Angeles, California, Friday, April 19, 2013: 
 Afternoon session (12:00 pm PT) –  Florida (197.775), LSU (197.325), Georgia (197.150), Minnesota (196.375), Illinois (195.700), Stanford (194.700)
 Evening session (6 pm PT) – Alabama (197.350), Oklahoma (197.200), UCLA (197.200), Michigan (196.850), Utah (196.200), Arkansas (196.150)

NCAA Championship (Super Six Finals)
NCAA Championship (Super Six Finals): Los Angeles, California, Saturday, April 20 (4 p.m. PT) - 
 Team - Florida (197.575), Oklahoma (197.375), Alabama (197.350), UCLA (197.100), LSU (197.050), Georgia (196.675)

Individual Event Finals

Individual Event Finals: Los Angeles, California, Sunday, April 21 (1 p.m. PT)
 Vault – 1st Diandra Milliner, Alabama & Rheagan Courville, LSU (9.9250); 3rd Olivia Courtney, UCLA (9.9167)
 Uneven Parallel Bars – 1st Alaina Johnson, Florida (9.9125); 2nd Bridget Sloan, Florida & Georgia Dabritz, Utah (9.9000)
 Balance Beam – 1st Bridget Sloan, Florida (9.9000); 2nd Hanna Nordquist, Minnesota & Katie Zurales, Michigan (9.8875)
 Floor Exercise – 1st Joanna Sampson, Michigan (9.9375); 2nd Diandra Milliner, Alabama (9.9250); 3rd Emily Wong, Nebraska (9.9125)
 All Around – Bridget Sloan, Florida, 39.600

Champions

References

External links
 NCAA Gymnastics Championship official site

NCAA Women's Gymnastics championship
2013 in American sports
2013 in sports in California
NCAA Women's Gymnastics Championship